No Habla is the fourth solo album by Robby Krieger, former guitarist for The Doors. The album was released in 1989 on I.R.S. Records.

Track listing 
 "Wild Child" (The Doors) 4:43
 "Eagles Song" (Krieger) 2:33
 "It's Gonna Work Out Fine" (Ike Turner) 4:01
 "Lonely Teardrops" (Tyran Carlo, Gwen Fuqua, Berry Gordy) 2:46
 "Love It or Leave It" (Krieger) 4:58
 "The Big Hurt (Dolores)" (Wayne Shanklin) 5:06
 "Piggy's Song" (Krieger) 3:38
 "I Want You, I Need You, I Love You" (Ira Kosloff, Maurice Mysels) 3:32
 "You're Lost Little Girl" (The Doors) 3:42

Personnel
Musicians
 Robby Krieger – bass, guitar, keyboards, vocals
 Arthur Barrow – bass, guitar, keyboards, programming
 Brian Auger – keyboards
 David Woodford – keyboards
 Skip Vanwinkle – keyboards
 Jack Conrad – bass
 John Avila – bass
 Gary Mallaber – drums
 John "Vatos" Hernandez – drums
 Bruce Gary – drums, percussion
 Scott Gordon – drums, harmonica, harp

Production
 Robby Krieger – producer
 Bruce Botnick – producer
 Danny St. Pierre – engineer
 Scott Gordon – engineer, producer, mixing
 Stephen Marcussen – mastering

References

1989 albums
Robby Krieger albums
albums produced by Bruce Botnick
I.R.S. Records albums